Shayar may refer to:

 Shayar (poet), poet who wrote Sher in the Urdu or Hindi language
 Shayar, Iran, a village in Kurdistan Province, Iran
 Xayar County, or Shayar County, in Aksu Prefecture, Xinjiang, China
 Xayar Town, seat of Xayar County
 Shair (1949 film), starring Dev Anand